Native element minerals are those elements that occur in nature in uncombined form with a distinct mineral structure. The elemental class includes metals, intermetallic compounds, alloys, metalloids, and nonmetals. The Nickel–Strunz classification system also includes the naturally occurring phosphides, silicides, nitrides, carbides, and arsenides.

Elements
The following elements occur as native element minerals or alloys:

Nickel–Strunz Classification -01- Native elements 
This list uses the Classification of Nickel–Strunz (mindat.org, 10 ed, pending publication).

Abbreviations
 "*" – discredited (IMA/CNMNC status).
 "?" – questionable/doubtful (IMA/CNMNC status).
 "REE" – Rare-earth element (Sc, Y, La, Ce, Pr, Nd, Pm, Sm, Eu, Gd, Tb, Dy, Ho, Er, Tm, Yb, Lu)
 "PGE" – Platinum-group element (Ru, Rh, Pd, Os, Ir, Pt)
 03.C Aluminofluorides, 06 Borates, 08 Vanadates (04.H V[5,6] Vanadates), 09 Silicates:
 Neso: insular (from Greek νησος nēsos, island)
 Soro: grouping (from Greek σωροῦ sōros, heap, mound (especially of corn))
 Cyclo: ring
 Ino: chain (from Greek ις [genitive: ινος inos], fibre)  
 Phyllo: sheet (from Greek φύλλον phyllon, leaf) 
 Tecto: three-dimensional framework

Nickel–Strunz code scheme NN.XY.##x:
 NN: Nickel–Strunz mineral class number
 X: Nickel–Strunz mineral division letter
 Y: Nickel–Strunz mineral family letter
 ##x: Nickel–Strunz mineral/group number, x add-on letter

Class: native elements 
 01.A Metals and intermetallic alloys
 01.AA Copper-cupalite family: 05 native copper, 05 lead, 05 native gold, 05 native silver, 05 nickel, 05 aluminium; 10a auricupride, 10b tetra-auricupride; 15 novodneprite, 15 khatyrkite, 15 anyuiite; 20 cupalite, 25 hunchunite
 01.AB Zinc-brass family (Cu-Zn alloys): 05 cadmium, 05 zinc, 05 titanium*, 05 rhenium*; 10a brass*, 10a zhanghengite, 10b danbaite, 10b tongxinite*
 01.AC Indium-tin family: 05 indium, 10 tin; 15 yuanjiangite, 15 sorosite
 01.AD Mercury-amalgam family: 00 amalgam*, 05 mercury; 10 belendorffite, 10 kolymite; 15a paraschachnerite, 15a schachnerite, 15b luanheite, 15c eugenite, 15d moschellandsbergite; 20a weishanite, 20b goldamalgam*; 25 potarite, 30 leadamalgam 
 01.AE Iron-chromium family: 05 kamacite? (iron var.), 05 iron, 05 chromium; 10 antitaenite*, 10 taenite, 10 tetrataenite; 15 chromferide, 15 wairauite, 15 ferchromide; 20 awaruite, 25 jedwabite
 01.AF Platinum-group elements: 05 osmium, 05 rutheniridosmine, 05 ruthenium; 10 palladium, 10 iridium, 10 rhodium, 10 platinum
 01.AG PGE-metal alloys: 05 garutiite, 05 hexaferrum; 10 atokite, 10 zvyagintsevite, 10 rustenburgite; 15 taimyrite, 15 tatyanaite; 20 paolovite; 25 plumbopalladinite, 25 stannopalladinite; 30 cabriite; 35 chengdeite, 35 isoferroplatinum; 40 ferronickelplatinum, 40 tetraferroplatinum, 40 tulameenite; 45 hongshiite*, 45 skaergaardite; 50 yixunite, 55 damiaoite, 60 niggliite, 65 bortnikovite, 70 nielsenite  
 01.B Metallic carbides, silicides, nitrides and phosphides
 01.BA Carbides: 05 cohenite; 10 isovite, 10 haxonite; 15 tongbaite; 20 khamrabaevite, 20 niobocarbide, 20 tantalcarbide; 25 qusongite, 30 yarlongite
 01.BB Silicides: zangboite; 05 mavlyanovite, 05 suessite; 10 perryite, 15 fersilicite*, 20 ferdisilicite*, 25 luobusaite, 30 gupeiite, 35 hapkeite, 40 xifengite  
 01.BC Nitrides: 05 roaldite, 10 siderazot, 15 carlsbergite, 15 osbornite
 01.BD Phosphides: 05 schreibersite, 05 nickelphosphide; 10 barringerite, 10 monipite; 15 allabogdanite, 15 florenskyite, 15 andreyivanovite; 20 melliniite
 01.C Metalloids and nonmetals
 01.CA Arsenic group elements: 05 bismuth, 05 antimony, 05 arsenic, 05 stibarsen; 10 arsenolamprite, 10 pararsenolamprite; 15 paradocrasite
 01.CB Carbon-silicon family: 05a graphite, 05b chaoite, 05c fullerite; 10a diamond, 10b lonsdaleite, 15 silicon
 01.CC Sulfur-selenium-iodine: 05 sulfur, 05 rosickyite; 10 tellurium, 10 selenium
 01.D Nonmetallic carbides and nitrides
 01.DA Nonmetallic carbides: 05 moissanite
 01.DB Nonmetallic nitrides: 05 nierite, 10 sinoite
 01.X Unclassified Strunz elements (metals and intermetallic alloys; metalloids and nonmetals; carbides, silicides, nitrides, phosphides)
 01.XX Unknown: 00 hexamolybdenum, 00 tantalum*, 00 brownleeite

See also
Free element
Gangue
Native metal
Native state

References 

 
 
 
 Mineralsystematik nach Strunz 9. Auflage von 2001 (aktuell)
 Hr. Dr. Udo Neumann der Uni-Tuebingen (Systematik der Minerale)

 
Classification of minerals